Héctor Franco López (born 20 February 1963) is a Mexican politician from the Institutional Revolutionary Party. From 2009 to 2011 he served as Deputy of the LXI Legislature of the Mexican Congress representing Coahuila.

References

1963 births
Living people
People from Tapachula
Institutional Revolutionary Party politicians
21st-century Mexican politicians
Deputies of the LXI Legislature of Mexico
Members of the Chamber of Deputies (Mexico) for Coahuila